The Skudde (also, East Prussian Skudde, German: Ostpreußische Skudde) is a breed of domesticated sheep from Estonia, Germany, Latvia, Lithuania, and Switzerland.

Characteristics
The wool is white, brown, black and gray. It has fine wool fibers, dispersed with short and course fiber. Lambs typically will have dark red or rust colored markings on their nape of their neck and legs.

References

Sheep breeds
Sheep breeds originating in Estonia
Sheep breeds originating in Germany
Sheep breeds originating in Lithuania
Sheep breeds originating in Switzerland
Animal breeds on the GEH Red List